In the run-up to the 1999 National Assembly for Wales election, various organisations carried out opinion polling to gauge voting intentions. The results of such polls are displayed in this list. Most of the pollsters listed are members of the British Polling Council (BPC) and abide by its disclosure rules.

The date range for these opinion polls was from July 1998, shortly before the passing of the Government of Wales Act 1998, to 6 May 1999 when the election took place.

Constituency vote

Regional vote

References

Opinion polling in Wales
1999
Elections in Wales
Politics of Wales
Opinion polling for United Kingdom votes in the 1990s